Prajnanananda Institute of Technology & Management, commonly referred to as PITM, is a college in Kolkata in the Indian state of West Bengal. It is affiliated to Maulana Abul Kalam Azad University of Technology, West Bengal (formerly known as West Bengal University of Technology).

Address
94/2, Park Street, Kolkata 700017. (Near Park Circus 7 point).

References
 College List
 College list on University website

External links

Universities and colleges in Kolkata
Educational institutions in India with year of establishment missing